Zdeněk Hřib (born 21 May 1981) is a Czech healthcare manager and Czech Pirate Party politician who served as the Mayor of Prague from November 2018 to February 2023.

Initially a physician, Hřib held managerial and consulting positions in state, corporate and non-profit healthcare entities dedicated to digitization, quality control, and consumer protection. He ran unsuccessfully in the 2014 Prague municipal election, but assumed office following the 2018 municipal election, where the Pirates ranked second and formed a governing coalition with the third and fourth-ranked parties that holds 39 out of 65 seats in the Prague City Assembly.

Early life and career
Zdeněk Hřib was born on 21 May 1981 in Slavičín, near the city of Zlín in the south-east of the Czech Republic. He studied medicine at the Charles University in Prague and participated in a student exchange program in Taiwan.

Subsequently, Hřib held managerial positions in the healthcare industry, focusing on digitization of healthcare services. Since 2012, he has been the director and founder of a non-profit organization that provides quality control, efficiency assessment and consulting for healthcare providers as well as consumer protection for healthcare customers.

In 2013, Hřib became a registered supporter of the Czech Pirate Party and ran unsuccessfully in the 2014 Prague municipal election.

Mayor of Prague (2018–2023)

The Pirates ranked second in the 2018 Prague municipal election winning 13 out of 65 seats in the Prague City Assembly and formed a governing coalition with the third and fourth-ranked coalitions that holds a total of 39 out of 65 seats. Hřib, as the leading Pirate candidate with 75,082 votes, was elected the Mayor of Prague on 15 November 2018 by the Prague City Assembly and took over the office from Adriana Krnáčová.

In 2018, during a meeting with foreign diplomats in Prague, Hřib was asked by the Chinese ambassador to the Czech Republic to expel the representative of Taiwan, and Hřib refused to do so. He has criticized a clause of the sister city agreement between Prague and Beijing that references to the One-China principle and he stated that this policy is "a complicated matter of foreign politics between two countries" and therefore "has no place in the sister cities agreement". Hřib also subsequently criticized a retaliatory decision of the Chinese government to cancel a planned tour of China by the Prague Philharmonia as a politicization of culture. According to The Guardian, Hřib was responsible for restoring the "Czech Republic’s image as a champion of human rights". Hřib visited Taiwan as the Mayor twice, first in 2019 and again in 2020.

In December 2019, Hřib was among the four mayors of Visegrád Group capitals Prague, Warsaw, Bratislava and Budapest, who signed the Pact of Free Cities, agreeing to protect "common values of freedom, human dignity, democracy, equality, rule of law, social justice, tolerance and cultural diversity".

On 17 January 2019, Hřib appealed to the city council to name a street in Prague in honor of Paweł Adamowicz, the former mayor of Gdańsk in Poland who was assassinated on 13 January 2019. On 5 June 2019, the street in Riegrovy Sady park named after Adamowicz was officially inaugurated. In February 2020, he named the square in front of the Russian embassy “Boris Nemtsov Square”. In April 2020, Hřib oversaw the removal of the statue dedicated to Soviet marshal Ivan Konev, as Konev is viewed in the Czech Republic as a symbol of Soviet-era oppression.

In April 2020, Hřib was put under police protection, because Czech intelligence had received evidence of a planned poisoning attack by the Russian secret service.

Personal life 
Hřib is married and has three children. As a mayor, he commutes by public transport.

See also
Healthcare in the Czech Republic
Healthcare in Europe

References

External links
 
 
 Zdeněk Hřib on Czech Pirate Party website

1981 births
21st-century Czech politicians
Czech Pirate Party mayors
Mayors of places in the Czech Republic
Living people
People from Slavičín
Charles University alumni
Mayors of Prague